Ronald Norman Dalby (September 5, 1929 – October 28, 2014) was a Canadian engineer. He served as Chancellor of the University of Alberta from 1974 to 1978. Dalby was born in Edmonton and attended primary schooling there. He attended the University of Alberta and graduated in 1952 with a Bachelor of Science degree in civil engineering. He then worked as a manager for Imperial Oil and  Northwestern Utilities. From 1967 to 1968 and from 1973 to 1974, he was President of the Association of Professional Engineers, Geologists, and Geophysicists of Alberta (APEGGA). Dalby continued to work in the utilities industry as an executive, and was vice president of  Canadian Utilities Limited when he was elected Chancellor of the University of Alberta in 1984. He died in 2014.

References

1929 births
2014 deaths
Canadian civil engineers
People from Edmonton
University of Alberta alumni
Chancellors of the University of Alberta